HMS Cruizer was a  launched in 1828 for the British Royal Navy. The ship was built as a revival of the retired Snake-class ship-sloops. The Navy converted her to a brig in 1831, back to a ship in 1840, and sold her at Bombay in 1849.

Career
Medina had grounded while delivering immigrants.

In 1839 Cruizer participated in the Aden Expedition along with the frigate  and the two British East India Company (EIC) vessels, the sloop  and the schooner .

Service in China
Cruizer saw extensive service during the First Opium War. She participated in the Battle of Whampoa, the Second Battle of Chuenpi, the Battle of Canton, the Battle of Amoy, and the Battle of First Bar. During the Battle of Whampoa, Major General Hugh Gough, commander of the British Army during the First Opium War, personally directed the land assault on Whampoa island from Cruizers deck.

The transport  was wrecked on 14 August 1840 about 10 miles north of Napakiang (Naha) at Great Loochow Island (Okinawa). The Okinawans built a junk for the crew and passengers from Indian Oak that was given the name Loochoo. Cruizer and  arrived on 16 September. Cruizer sailed shortly thereafter. Nimrod and Loochoo, which was carrying the people from Indian Oak, sailed on 28 September and arrived at Chusan on 5 October.

In January 1841, Cruizer recaptured the whaling brig . The local inhabitants in the Nicobar Islands had captured Pilot in December 1840 and murdered most of her crew. Pilot was taken into Singapore.

Notes, citations and references 
Notes

Citations

References
 
 
Bulletins of State Intelligence. Westminster: F. Watts. 1841.

1828 ships
Sloops of the Royal Navy